Dark Shadows: The Night Whispers is a 2010 Big Finish Productions original dramatic reading based on the long-running American horror soap opera series Dark Shadows.

Plot 
As a storm rages through Collinsport, a mysterious spirit threatens Barnabas Collins.

Cast
Barnabas Collins – Jonathan Frid
Willie Loomis – John Karlen
Celeste – Barbara Steele

External links
Dark Shadows - The Night Whispers

Dark Shadows audio plays
2010 audio plays